William Henry Ladner (November 28, 1826 – November 1, 1907) was an English-born miner, farmer and political figure in British Columbia. He represented New Westminster from 1886 to 1890 in the Legislative Assembly of British Columbia.

Life
Ladner was born in Cornwall, the son of Edward Ladner and Sarah Ellis. In 1848, he emigrated to Mineral Point, Wisconsin where his father had arrived earlier with other Cornish miners. After his father died in 1851, Ladner and his brother Thomas Ellis travelled to California to mine for gold. In 1858, they headed north and joined the rush to the newly discovered gold fields in the Fraser River canyon in British Columbia. Ladner was named a constable for the region. In 1865, with partner Robert Thompson Smith, he was involved in transporting goods to the Big Bend region on the Columbia River. After mining in the area was found to be unproductive, Ladner's business collapsed and he began farming in the delta of the Fraser River. In 1879, he lobbied for the creation of a new rural municipality, Delta. Ladner served as reeve and local police constable.

Ladner ran unsuccessfully for a seat in New Westminster District before being elected in 1886. He was defeated when he ran for re-election in 1890. He later took part in the formation of the provincial Conservative party. He ran unsuccessfully as a Conservative for the assembly seat representing Delta in 1903.

Ladner was married twice: first to Mary Ann Booth in 1866 and then to Mrs. Ella B. McLellan in 1897. He died in Ladner, named after the two brothers, at the age of 80.

References

External links 
 
 

1826 births
1907 deaths
Independent MLAs in British Columbia
British emigrants to Canada
Canadian people of Cornish descent